McCafferty Spur is a spur on the north face of Butcher Ridge, in the Cook Mountains of Antarctica,  northwest of Mount Ayres. It was named after Anne McCafferty, a geophysicist with the United States Geological Survey (USGS), who in 1991–92 worked on a USGS aeromagnetic survey over the Ross Ice Shelf and, in a cooperative USGS–German project, participated in the first aeromagnetic flight across the Butcher Ridge and Cook Mountains.

References

External links

Ridges of the Ross Dependency
Hillary Coast